Ricky Echolette (born Wolfgang Neuhaus) is a former member of the German synth-pop Alphaville, utilizing his role on keyboards, piano and guitars - from 1985 until his departure in 1997.

In January 1985, he replaced Frank Mertens, who had just left Alphaville, after the release of their first album Forever Young.

Marian Gold was an old friend of his, had already asked Echolette to join the group two years earlier, but he declined the offer, as he stayed in Marian's previous group Chinchilla Green.

He left Alphaville in 1997 during the production of Salvation and now lives in the South of France with his family.

References

External links

German male musicians
Living people
German new wave musicians
Synth-pop new wave musicians
Musicians from Cologne
1958 births
Alphaville (band) members